Jupally Rameswar Rao (born 16 September 1955) is an Indian businessman. He is the founder-chairman of My Home Group, a Hyderabad-based company with a presence in realty estate, cement, and power sectors. One of the brands of his company, Maha Cement has a reported annual revenue of ₹3,000 crore. As per Forbes magazine, Rameswar Rao has a net worth of US$1 billion, as of April 2022.

Early life 
Prior to entering his business, Rameswar Rao practiced homeopathy.

Business career 
In 1981, he established My Home Constructions Private Limited, that has an annual revenue of ₹650 crore as of November 2016. 

Rameswar Rao ventured into cement business and started Maha Cement (My Home Industries Private Limited), which he later encashed by selling 50% to CRH plc, an Irish company for ₹1429 crore in 2008. He bought the 3.2 million tonne cement plant Sree Jayajyothi Cements from Shriram Epc for ₹1,400 crore in 2013. Now the company has 10-million tonne cement capacity, making Maha Cement one of the largest cement producers in South India.

As of April 2022, he has a net worth of US$1 billion according to Forbes.

Recognition 
In May 2017, he was awarded with Lifetime Achievement Award by M. Venkaiah Naidu, the Union Minister of Urban Development, Housing and Urban Poverty Alleviation at HMTV Business Excellence Awards - 2017.

References

1955 births
Living people
Indian businesspeople in cement
Indian real estate businesspeople
Indian billionaires
Indian philanthropists
Businesspeople from Telangana
People from Mahbubnagar district